"Baby Doll" is the third single to be released by American pop group Girlicious. The whole song was performed for the first time by Girlicious on television, when they were on Live @ Much on August 6, 2008. This was the last single of Girlicious having four girls in the band. After Tiffanie Anderson's departure, Natalie Mejia started performing Tiffanie's verse.

Release 
A 1:30 preview of "Baby Doll" premiered online on August 1, 2008. It was confirmed by Natalie Mejia that the song was the group's third single. The single was released on iTunes Canada in November. It was also stated by Tiffanie that "Baby Doll" will hit the US in the beginning of the 2009. However the music video was already available on iTunes in the US since 2008.

It first entered the Canadian Hot 100 at #75 due to digital downloads during the week the album was released. It re-entered the chart and peaked at #55 after approximately 4 months due to its single release.

Music video
According to Chrystina Sayers' official MySpace page, Girlicious will be going to the US to shoot a music video for "Baby Doll". Bandmate, Tiffanie Anderson confirmed on her MySpace blog that they will be shooting the video on October 6.

The music video premiered on the show OnSet on popular Canadian music station, Much Music, which takes viewers behind the scenes on the set of "Baby Doll". It was directed by Matt Mcdermitt.

The video starts off with the girls in metallic mini dresses and fur, singing in a green Cadillac with hydraulics. They move on to singing in separate scenes and clips of them dancing outside of the Cadillac with the hood up. Girlicious then goes onto "the party scene," performing with male back-up dancers and ends in the "party-scene" with the Girlicious girls laughing with pink money falling from above. The video was shot in Los Angeles, at the Quixtoe Studios and was overseen by Robin Antin and Mikey Minden.

The music video was released to iTunes on Nov 20, 2008, which caused confusion as to if the single was released everywhere as well. However it is only a single in Canada for the time being.

"Baby Doll" also reached #4 on Canada's MuchMusic Countdown.

Charts

References 

2008 singles
Music videos directed by Joseph Kahn
Girlicious songs
Song recordings produced by the Runners
2008 songs
Geffen Records singles
Songs written by Jermaine Jackson (hip hop producer)
Songs written by Andrew Harr